Gloria Adwoa Amon Nikoi, née Addae (6 June 1927 – 10 November 2010) was as a Ghanaian diplomat who served as the Foreign Minister in 1979 under the Armed Forces Revolutionary Council (AFRC) government. She was the first Ghanaian woman to hold this position.

Career
She attended Achimota College. Nikoi was the Deputy Chief of Mission to the United Nations from 1969 to 1974. Gloria Nikoi later worked as a senior official in the Ghanaian Ministry of Foreign Affairs.

After the military coup of June 4, 1979 which overthrew the Supreme Military Council government, she was made foreign minister for about four months in the Armed Forces Revolutionary Council (AFRC) government of Flight lieutenant Jerry Rawlings. This ended on September 24, 1979, when the Third Republic under Dr. Hilla Limann's People's National Party government was inaugurated.

Gloria Nikoi became the Chairperson of the erstwhile Bank for Housing and Construction, a Ghanaian bank, in 1981. She had also been a director of the African Development Bank (AfDB). She became the first Chairperson of the Council of the Ghana Stock Exchange when it was inaugurated on November 12, 1990.

Personal life 
She was married to Amon Nikoi, a former Governor of the Bank of Ghana and Finance minister, with whom she had three children.

Death and funeral 
She died of natural causes in Washington, D.C. on 10 November 2010 at the age of 83. Her funeral service was held at the Accra Ridge Church, where she was a congregant.

See also
Minister for Foreign Affairs (Ghana)

References

External links
 Picture of Gloria Amon Nikoi (Polish website)

1927 births
Foreign ministers of Ghana
Ghanaian women diplomats
Alumni of Achimota School
Female foreign ministers
20th-century Ghanaian politicians
20th-century Ghanaian women politicians
Women government ministers of Ghana
2010 deaths